The Philadelphia Eagles, a professional American football team based in Philadelphia, joined the National Football League (NFL) in 1933 as a replacement team for the Frankford Yellow Jackets, after the Yellow Jackets went bankrupt and ceased operations. After the AFL–NFL merger in 1970, the Eagles were moved to the current NFC East division. Every April, each NFL franchise adds new players to its roster through a collegiate draft at the "NFL Annual Player Selection Meeting", more commonly known as the NFL Draft. Teams are ranked in inverse order based on their previous season's records, with the worst record picking first, the second-worst picking second, and so on. Two exceptions to this order are made for teams that played in the previous Super Bowl: the Super Bowl champion picks last (32nd), and the Super Bowl loser picks next to last (31st).  Teams often trade their picks to other teams for different picks, players, cash, or combinations thereof; thus, it is not uncommon for a team's actual draft pick to differ from its assigned pick, or for a team to have extra or no draft picks in a particular round.

The Eagles' first selection as an NFL team was Jay Berwanger, a running back from University of Chicago. The Eagles have selected number one overall three times, including Berwanger in 1936, Sam Francis in 1937, and Chuck Bednarik in 1949,  second overall five times, and third overall three times. Three eventual Hall of Famers have been selected by the Eagles: Steve Van Buren, Bednarik, and Bob Brown. The team's most recent first-round choice was Jordan Davis, a defensive tackle from Georgia.

Key

Player selections

Footnotes 
The 1941 pick was traded to the Chicago Bears.
This was a lottery bonus pick.
The Eagles obtained this choice from Detroit.
Eagles traded their 1953 first-round pick to Los Angeles Rams.
Eagles traded their 1959 first-round pick to Los Angeles Rams for Norm Van Brocklin.
Eagles traded their 1962 first-round pick to St. Louis Cardinals for King Hill.
Eagles traded their 1965 first-round pick along with Lee Roy Caffey to Green Bay Packers for Jim Ringo and Earl Gros.
Eagles traded their 1974 first-round pick and 1975 first and third-round picks to Los Angeles Rams for Roman Gabriel.
The Eagles traded the 1976 first-round pick to Cincinnati Bengals for Mike Boryla.
Eagles traded their 1977 first-round and 1978 1st- and 2nd-round draft picks to Cincinnati for Bill Bergey.
The Eagles traded the 1989 draft pick to Indianapolis Colts for Ron Solt.
Eagles traded their 1991 and 1992 first-round draft picks to Green Bay, for Green Bay's 1991 first-round pick.
The Eagles had obtained a 1993 first-round pick (13th overall) from NFL as compensation for the departure of Reggie White. Eagles then traded this to Houston for their first pick plus their third-round selection.
The 1995 pick was obtained from Tampa Bay in exchange for Eagles' 1995 first-round pick (12th overall) in the first round and picks 43 and 63 in the 2nd round; Eagles also received Tampa's third-round pick (72nd pick overall) in 1995.
In 1997 Eagles traded their first-round pick (22nd overall) to Dallas in exchange for the Cowboys’ 1997 first-round pick (25th overall), 1997 fifth-round pick (155th overall) and the Cowboys' best 1998 third-round pick.
The 2003 first-round choice (15th pick overall) was obtained from San Diego in exchange for Eagles' 2003 first-round pick (30th pick overall), and 2003 second-round pick (62nd pick overall). That second-round pick was acquired from Green Bay for CB Al Harris and a fourth-round pick in 2003.
The 2004 first-round draft choice (16th pick overall) was obtained from San Francisco for Eagles' 2004 first-round pick (28th pick overall) and the 2004 second-round pick (58th pick overall).
Eagles traded their 2007 first-round pick (26th overall, used to select Anthony Spencer) to Dallas for the Cowboys' first second-round selection (36th overall, acquired from Cleveland in a trade, used to select Kevin Kolb), their third-round selection (87th overall, used to select Stewart Bradley), and their fifth-round selection (159th overall, used to select C.J. Gaddis).
Eagles traded their 2008 first-round selection (19th overall) to Carolina for Carolina's 2008 second- and fourth-round selections (43rd and 109th), and Carolina's 2009 first-round pick.
Eagles traded their 2009 first-round selection (21st overall) and sixth-round selection to Cleveland for Cleveland's 2009 first-round selection (19th overall), used to select Jeremy Maclin.
Eagles traded their 2010 first-round selection (24th overall) and two third-round selections (70th and 87th overall) to Denver for Denver's 2010 first-round selection (13th overall), used to select Brandon Graham.
Eagles traded their 2012 first-round selection (15th overall), fourth-round selection (114th overall), and sixth-round selection (172nd overall) to Seattle for Seattle's 2012 first-round selection (12th overall), used to select Fletcher Cox.
Eagles traded their 2018 first- and fourth-round selections (32nd and 132nd overall) to Baltimore in exchange for their second- and fourth-round selections (52nd and 125th overall) and a second-round selection in 2019.
Eagles traded their 2019 first, fourth, and sixth-round selections (25th, 127th, and 197th  overall) to Baltimore for Baltimore's first-round selection (22nd overall), used to select Andre Dillard.

References 
General

 
 

Specific

Philadelphia Eagles

first-round draft picks